Clifton Forge is a town in Alleghany County, Virginia, United States which is part of the greater Roanoke Region.   The population was 3,555 at the 2020 census.  The Jackson River flows through the town, which as a result was once known as Jackson's River Station.

Clifton Forge was an independent city during the 2000 census. However, in 2001, Clifton Forge gave up its city status and reverted to a town. In previous decades, the railroad was a major employer. Clifton Forge is known for its mountain views and clear streams.

History
Clifton Forge Commercial Historic District, Clifton Forge Residential Historic District, Clifton Furnace, Jefferson School, and Longdale Furnace Historic District are listed on the National Register of Historic Places.

Transportation
Amtrak, the national passenger rail service, provides service to the Clifton Forge station with the Cardinal route. Also Clifton Forge serves a major locomotive fuel facility for CSX Transportation and is home to the Chesapeake & Ohio Historical Society and C&O Railway Heritage Center.

Clifton Forge is serviced by three major highways, Interstate 64, US Route 60, and US Route 220.

Geography
Clifton Forge is located at  (37.819801, -79.823584).

Portions of the town were built upon a bridge, elevating the town above a stream.

Demographics

As of the census of 2010, there were 3,884 people, 1,701 households, and 982 families residing in the town.  The population density was 1,252.9 people per square mile (485.5/km2).  There were 2,004 housing units at an average density of 646.5 per square mile (225.2/km2).  The racial makeup of the city was 84.4% White, 11.8% Black or African American, 0.2% Native American, 0.4% Asian, 0.4% from other races, and 2.8% from two or more races. Hispanic or Latino of any race were 1.7% of the population.

There were 1,701 households, out of which 23.9% had children under the age of 18 living with them, 37.8% were married couples living together, 13.8% had a female householder with no husband present, and 42.3% were non-families. 37.4% of all households were made up of individuals, and 19.1% had someone living alone who was 65 years of age or older.  The average household size was 2.18 and the average family size was 2.85.

In the city, the population was spread out, with 21.7% under the age of 18, 6.8% from 18 to 24, 20.4% from 25 to 44, 28.5% from 45 to 64, and 22.6% who were 65 years of age or older.  The median age was 45.8 years. For every 100 females, there were 87.2 males.  For every 100 females age 18 and over, there were 82.7 males.

The median income for a household in the city was $34,256, and the median income for a family was $53,547. Males had a median income of $38,500 versus $29,630 for females. The per capita income for the city was $20,833.  About 14.3% of families and 23.3% of the population were below the poverty line, including 33.4% of those under age 18 and 10.4% of those age 65 or over.

Climate
The climate in this area is characterized by hot, humid summers and generally mild to cool winters.  According to the Köppen Climate Classification system, Clifton Forge has a humid subtropical climate, abbreviated "Cfa" on climate maps.

In popular culture
Mama (2013 horror film) Although the film was produced in Canada, it is set in Clifton Forge. 
The 1985 video for "Driver 8" by R.E.M. was partly filmed in and around the C&O (Chessie System) yards.
Dopesick (miniseries), based on the book by Beth Macy, was filmed in several different areas of Clifton Forge.

Notable people

Natives
People born in Clifton Forge:
Gary Ray Bowles (1962-2019) - serial killer
Dana Brunetti (born 1973) - media executive
Bray Cary (born 1948) - politician
Lisa Disbrow (born 1962) - US Air Force secretary
Oscar L. Heltzen (1882-1968) - lawyer
Richard L. Hoffman (1927-2012) - zoologist
Johnny Humphries (1915-1965) - baseball pitcher
Trudi Lacey, basketball player and coach
Nancy Massie Meadows (1912-1986) - governor
Nathan Moore (born 1970) - musician known as "Percy Byrd"
William Overstreet Jr. (1921-2013) - WW2 pilot
Ira De Augustine Reid (1901-1968) - sociologist
Denny Riddleberger (born 1945) - baseballer
Bryan Stinespring (born 1963) - football coach
James T. Turner (born 1938) - senior judge
Roger Arliner Young (1899-1964) - scientist

Politics

See also 
 Former counties, cities, and towns of Virginia

References

External links

 Town of Clifton Forge
 Travel & Tourism

Towns in Virginia
Towns in Alleghany County, Virginia
Populated places on the James River (Virginia)
Railway towns in Virginia